Daniel Michael McGurl (October 2, 1896 – April 17, 1976) was a United States Navy admiral.

He was born in Minersville, Pennsylvania and graduated from United States Naval Academy in 1919.

In World War II, he commanded the attack cargo ship , and the light cruiser  from her commissioning on 31 August 1943 to October 1944, and was later promoted to rear admiral. He retired on 30 June 1949.

At the time of his death, he lived in Lower Merion, Pennsylvania.  He is buried in Arlington National Cemetery.

Awards
McGurl received the Legion of Merit in 1943 for his actions while in command of Alcyone during the Allied invasion of Sicily, and second Legion of Merit for his command of Biloxi in the Pacific in 1944. He also received the Silver Star for successfully repelling an attempted attack by Japanese aircraft on the Fast Carrier Task Force on 13 October 1944.

References

1896 births
1976 deaths
People from Minersville, Pennsylvania
United States Navy personnel of World War II
United States Navy admirals
Burials at Arlington National Cemetery
Recipients of the Silver Star
Recipients of the Legion of Merit
Military personnel from Pennsylvania